The 1877 Harvard Crimson football team represented Harvard University in the 1877 college football season. They finished with a 3–1 record. The team captain was Livingston Cushing.

On November 3, 1877, Harvard suffered its only loss to Princeton in a game played at St George's Cricket Club in Hoboken, New Jersey. The game was played under the "Amended Rugby" rules under which three touchdowns counted as a goal. Princeton scored one goal and one touchdown, and Harvard was held to one touchdown. The game was attended by 400 to 500 students in addition to "several hundred spectators, many of the number being of the fair sex, who came to the scene of battle in carriages."

Two days later, on Monday, November 5, Harvard defeated Columbia in a two-inning match played on the same St. George's Cricket Club grounds. Harvard won the game with six goals and four touchdowns. Columbia did not score.

Schedule

References

Harvard
Harvard Crimson football seasons
Harvard Crimson football